The 2022–23 Louisiana Tech Lady Techsters basketball team represents Louisiana Tech University during the 2022–23 NCAA Division I women's basketball season. The team was led by seventh-year head coach Brooke Stoehr, and played their home games at the Thomas Assembly Center in Ruston, Louisiana as a member of Conference USA.

Previous season
The Lady Techsters finished the 2021–22 season 21–12, 11–7 in C-USA play and won the C-USA West Division Regular Season Title. They defeated UAB and Middle Tennessee to advance to the championship game of the C-USA tournament where they lost to Charlotte. They were invited to the WNIT, where they lost at home to Houston.

Roster

Schedule and results

|-
!colspan=12 style=|Non-conference regular season

|-
!colspan=12 style=|CUSA regular season

|-
!colspan=12 style=| CUSA Tournament

|-
!colspan=12 style=| WNIT

See also
 Louisiana Tech Lady Techsters basketball

References

Louisiana Tech Lady Techsters basketball seasons
Louisiana Tech
Louisiana Tech Lady Techsters basketball
Louisiana Tech Lady Techsters basketball